Bluecurve is a desktop theme for GNOME and KDE created by the Red Hat Artwork project. The main aim of Bluecurve was to create a consistent look throughout the Linux environment, and provide support for various Freedesktop.org desktop standards. It was used in Red Hat Linux in version 8 and 9, and in its successor OS, Fedora Linux through version 4.

The Bluecurve window borders and GTK theme were replaced by those from Clearlooks (the former in Fedora Core 4, and the latter in Fedora Core 5). However, the old Bluecurve themes (windowing and widget) are still installed by default and can be selected in the theme manager. The Bluecurve icon set remains installed in Fedora 7, but has been replaced as the default by Echo.

There has been controversy surrounding the theme, especially the alterations to KDE, which were sufficient to cause developer Bernhard Rosenkraenzer to quit Red Hat, "mostly in mutual agreement — I don't want to work on crippling KDE, and they don't want an employee who admits RHL 8.0's KDE is crippleware." Others simply criticize it for giving the same look to both desktops, even though they are obviously different in many ways. This approach was subsequently emulated by Mandrake Linux with their "Galaxy" theme, which was also available for GNOME and KDE, and in Kubuntu 6.06 with the GTK-Qt theme engine (enabled by default).

Enterprising GUI artists have created themes that emulate the Bluecurve theme on other operating systems, including Microsoft Windows. Users can also replace their default Windows icons with icons that emulate Bluecurve, using the IconPackager application. One such set can be downloaded at WinCustomize.

See also 
 Clearlooks
 Adwaita (design language)

References

External links 
Fedora Artwork
Waikato Linux Users Group wiki article
Bluecurve icon pack for IconPackager (Windows)

Computer icons
Free software projects
GNOME
KDE
Red Hat software